Weissenau may refer to:

 Weissenau Abbey, a historical abbey near Ravensburg, Germany
 Weissenau Castle, a ruined castle in the Canton of Bern, Switzerland